The 1948 United States presidential election in Connecticut took place on November 2, 1948, as part of the 1948 United States presidential election. State voters chose eight electors to the Electoral College, which selected the president and vice president.

Connecticut was won by Republican candidate New York governor Thomas E. Dewey over Democratic candidate, incumbent President Harry S. Truman.

Dewey won the state by a narrow margin of 1.64%. As of 2022, this is the last election where Connecticut voted more Republican than Utah.

Results

By county

See also
 United States presidential elections in Connecticut

References

1948
Connecticut
1948 Connecticut elections